The Death of Polydorus is one of a set of seven tapestries showing a scene from the Iliad by Homer, here the death of Priam's son Polydorus in book VI, link 290 and book XXIV, line 49. It was produced between 1623 and 1626 and is now in the Museum of Fine Arts of Lyon, as is another piece from the set.  They are technically embroidery rather than being in a tapestry weave, but the images of the faces and flesh parts of the figures are appliqué painted silk satin pieces, reflecting a Chinese technique often used for Buddhist banners. The painting may have been done by Western artists, possibly in Europe. It measures 3.7 by 4.9 metres.

It was commissioned from a Chinese manufacturer, presumably in or near Macao, during the last years of the Ming dynasty by Francisco Mascarenhas, Portuguese governor of the Portuguese enclave of Macao from 1623 to 1626, since the medallions bear a female serpent and there is a lion a shield in each corner, the Mascarenhas family arms.

The unusual style at first glance resembles a European tapestry of the period, and elements of the composition are drawn from European prints.  The landscape, water and sky use Chinese motifs and conventions.  The piece uses cotton, wool, silk, and gold thread.

The other member of the set in Lyon shows The Vengeance of Hecuba.  Chinese motifs are rather less prominent in this interior scene.

Notes

References
"Lyon": Museum page (in French)
Archives du musée des Beaux-Arts de Lyon, catalogue no 1970/538

1620s works
Tapestries
Collections of the Museum of Fine Arts of Lyon
Works based on the Iliad
Ming dynasty art